Ezekiel "Zeke" Johnston (1871 – 1942) was an Irish footballer who played in the Football League for Burnley and Stoke.

Career
Johnston was born in Belfast and played for Glentoran before joining English league side Burnley in 1893. He spent two seasons at Turf Moor failing to displace Jack Hillman as first choice 'keeper and returned to Irish football with Belfast Celtic. However, he was given a chance again in English football with Stoke in 1896. He played 16 times in 1896–97 and 25 times in 1897–98 and was released once Stoke re-signed George Clawley. In October 1902 he saved three men from drowning at sea after diving in and pulling them to safety.

Career statistics
Source:

References

1871 births
1942 deaths
Association footballers from Belfast
Association football goalkeepers
Glentoran F.C. players
Burnley F.C. players
Belfast Celtic F.C. players
Stoke City F.C. players
English Football League players
Irish association footballers (before 1923)